Stagliano is an Italian surname, and may refer to:

 John Stagliano, U.S. pornographic actor
 Riccardo Staglianò, Italian online journalist
 Antonio Staglianò, Bishop of Noto, Sicily
 Nick Stagliano, film director and producer
 Tricia Devereaux, American pornographic actress

This list does not list everybody with this surname, rather, the known people.

Surnames
Italian-language surnames